William Arthur Losier (August 14, 1896 – April 8, 1952) was a Canadian politician. He served in the Legislative Assembly of New Brunswick as member of the Liberal party from 1935 to 1944.

References

1896 births
1952 deaths
20th-century Canadian politicians
New Brunswick Liberal Association MLAs
People from Gloucester County, New Brunswick